Machlotica eurymolybda is a species of sedge moth in the genus Machlotica. It was described by Edward Meyrick in 1927. It is found in Peru.

References

Moths described in 1927
Glyphipterigidae